Wilhelm Smith (April 10, 1870 – October 30, 1925) was a United States Navy sailor and a recipient of the United States military's highest decoration, the Medal of Honor.

Biography
Born in Germany, Smith immigrated to the United States and joined the U.S. Navy from New York.

On that day, a sanitary tank which collected runoff from the torpedo room, anchor chain locker, and anchor engine room was scheduled for a routine cleaning. The tank was inadequately ventilated, and the air inside was discovered to be too foul for men to enter. After allowing the empty tank to air out, the three-man cleaning crew was ordered to commence work. A hose was run to the tank from an ammunition handling room, of which Smith was in charge, and one sailor, Ordinary Seaman Peter J. Walsh, descended into the tank to begin cleaning. Walsh was quickly overcome by fumes and fell unconscious to the bottom of the chamber. His two companions rushed to the handling room where Smith was working and shut off the hose. While one of the men tried unsuccessfully to save Walsh, Smith gathered a rope and prepared to make his own rescue attempt.

Short and stocky, Smith struggled to fit his  frame through the small hatch into the tank. Making it through with great difficulty, he climbed to the bottom and tied the rope to Walsh's limp body. While ascending out of the tank, he too was overcome by the noxious gases and was pulled through the hatch unconscious by his fellow sailors. Both Smith and Walsh were taken to sick bay and resuscitated by use of a Pulmotor device. An officer on the New York stated that "Smith not only saved the life of Walsh, who could not have been resuscitated if he had been allowed to remain any longer, but he took a very great risk of not being able to get back himself through the manhole on account of his being so stout." For these actions, Smith was awarded the Medal of Honor three months later, on April 6.

Smith reached the rank of chief gunner's mate before leaving the Navy. He died at age 54 and was buried at Cypress Hills National Cemetery in Brooklyn, New York.

Medal of Honor citation
Smith's official Medal of Honor citation reads:
On board the U.S.S. New York, for entering a compartment filled with gases and rescuing a shipmate on 24 January

See also

List of Medal of Honor recipients

References

External links

1870 births
1925 deaths
German emigrants to the United States
Military personnel from New York (state)
United States Navy sailors
United States Navy Medal of Honor recipients
German-born Medal of Honor recipients
Non-combat recipients of the Medal of Honor